Fleming Park is an unincorporated community in Alberta, Canada within Parkland County that is recognized as a designated place by Statistics Canada.

Demographics 

See also 
List of communities in Alberta
List of designated places in Alberta

References 

Designated places in Alberta
Localities in Parkland County